Mattarella is an Italian surname that may refer to the following notable people: 
Bernardo Mattarella (1905–1971), Italian politician, father of Piersanti and Sergio
Laura Mattarella (born 1968), Italian lawyer, daughter of Sergio 
Piersanti Mattarella (1935–1980), Italian politician, brother of Sergio
Sergio Mattarella (born 1941), President of Italy

Italian-language surnames